Lilyvale may refer to:

Australia
 Lilyvale, New South Wales
 Lilyvale railway station
 Lilyvale, Queensland (Central Highlands Region)
 Lilyvale, Queensland (Toowoomba Region)
Lilyvale, The Rocks, a heritage-house in Sydney, New South Wales
 Lilyvale Important Bird Area, Queensland

United Kingdom
 Lilyvale, Kent, England

See also
 Lilyvale Stand Monument, Crinum, Queensland